Keith Malcolm Wilson (1944 - 9 February 2018) was an historian and author who was Professor of International Politics in the School of History at the University of Leeds.

Wilson received a DPhil for his thesis The role and influence of the professional advisers to the Foreign Office on the making of British foreign policy from December 1905 to August 1914. He has written a number of books on British foreign policy during the 19th and 20th century.

Works

Books
 Imperialism and Nationalism in the Middle East: The Anglo-Egyptian Experience, 1882-1982. London, England: Mansell Pub, 1983. 
Review,  The Middle East Journal, Winter, 1986, vol. 40, no. 1, p. 149
Review,  English Historical Review, Apr., 1986, vol. 101, no. 399, p. 546-547
Review,  Middle Eastern Studies, Jul., 1984, vol. 20, no. 3, p. 400-402
The Policy of the Entente: The Determinants of British Foreign Policy, 1904-1914    Cambridge University Press, 1985. 
Review,  The American Historical Review, Jun., 1986, vol. 91, no. 3, p. 669-670
Review,  English Historical Review, Apr., 1986, vol. 101, no. 399, p. 454-457
Review, Albion: A Quarterly Journal Concerned with British Studies, Summer, 1986, vol. 18, no. 2, p. 339-341
Empire and Continent: Studies in British Foreign Policy from the 1880s to the First World War. London: Mansell Pub, 1987. 
Review,  Bulletin of the School of Oriental and African Studies, University of London, 1989, vol. 52, no. 2, p. 375-376
A Study in the History and Politics of The "Morning Post", 1905-1926 (Lewiston: E. Mellen Press, 1990) 
British Foreign Secretaries and Foreign Policy / From Crimean War to First World War. London: Croom Helm, 1986 
Review, English Historical Review, Oct., 1989, vol. 104, no. 413, p. 1059–1061
Review, Victorian Studies, Winter, 1989, vol. 32, no. 2, p. 271-272
Decisions for War, 1914. New York: St. Martin's Press, 1995. 
Forging the Collective Memory: Government and International Historians Through Two World Wars. Providence: Berghahn Books, 1996. 
The International Impact of the Boer War. New York: Palgrave, 2001. 
The Limits of Eurocentricity: Imperial British Foreign and Defence Policy in the Early Twentieth Century. Analecta Isisiana, 90. Istanbul: Isis Press, 2006.

Articles
The "Protocols of Zion" and the "Morning Post," 1919-1920 in Patterns of Prejudice, Vol. 19, No. 3 (July 1985), pp. 5–14
"The Channel Tunnel Question at the Committee of Imperial Defence. 1990." Journal of strategic studies, (1990) p. 99-125.

References

1944 births
2018 deaths
English historians
Academics of the University of Leeds